Delray Connecting Railroad  is a railroad operating on Zug Island in Michigan. The railroad interchanges with the Canadian National (formerly Grand Trunk Western (GTW)), Norfolk Southern (NS), CSX and Conrail.

Delray Connecting Railroad is owned and operated by Transtar, Inc., the railroad division of U.S. Steel.  The Great Lakes Works, a steel mill, is the primary customer.

References

External links
Delray Connecting Railroad Company

Michigan railroads
Railway companies established in 1904
U.S. Steel